Silay Institute, informally referred to by its acronym SI, is a private, co-educational institution of learning located in Silay City, 14 kilometers north of Bacolod, the capital of Negros Occidental province in the Philippines. It is the only school in the city that offers formal college education.

History
The school, originally a high school, was established in 1925 after a group of concerned citizens had a survey conducted regarding the feasibility of opening such a school to serve the children of the locality, who after graduating from primary education, had no opportunities for acquiring secondary education.

A local doctor, Dr. Luis Gorgeous, initiated plans for establishing the school; he later became its first President. Another local resident, Ramon Legaspi, secured the necessary government permits, dr and procured instructional s for the institution.

See also
 St. Theresita's Academy
 Doña Montserrat Lopez Memorial High School

References

External links
Silay Institute on Wikimapia, Geo Links for Silay Institute

Schools in Silay
Educational institutions established in 1925
1925 establishments in the Philippines